Philippe J. Sansonetti (born 9 April 1949) is a French microbiologist, professor at the Pasteur Institute and the Collège de France in Paris. He is the director of the Inserm Unit 786 (Microbial colonisation and invasion of mucosa) and of the Institut Pasteur laboratory Pathogénie Microbienne Moléculaire.

Education 

Philippe Sansonetti completed General Microbiology, General Virology and Immunology courses at the Institut Pasteur and received his MS degree in Biochemistry/Microbiology from the University Paris VII Diderot in 1978 and obtained his MD degree from the University Paris VI in 1979. After a research fellowship at the Unité de Bactériologie Médicale headed by Léon Le Minor, he undertook a post-doctoral position in the laboratory of Professor Samuel Formal in the Department of Enteric Diseases at the Walter Reed Army Institute of Research, Washington, D.C. He returned to the Pasteur Institute in 1981 to the Enterobacteria Unit (Unité des entérobactéries) where he started his own research group. In 1989, he created and headed the Unité de Pathogénie Microbienne Moléculaire (Molecular Microbial Pathogenesis Unit). He practiced internal medicine at the Institut Pasteur hospital (1981–1985) before becoming head of its outpatient clinic (1985–1995) and then becoming its medical director (1995–1999 and 2004–2007). He was chairman of its Departments of Bacteriology and Mycology (1989–1992) and Cell Biology and Infection (2002–2006).

Sansonetti has held several scientific administration positions at INSERM, French Ministry of Research and Technology, as well as at the World Health Organization where he was chairman of the Steering committee on Diarrheal Diseases Vaccine Development.

Work and honours 

Research performed by Philippe Sansonetti has mainly been focused on the understanding of several aspects of the pathogenesis of Shigella, a bacterium causing severe diarrhoea. His work spans a large set of disciplines in biology and medicine and ranges from molecular genetics, to cell biology, immunology and the development of vaccines against dysentery. Sansonetti's laboratory has notably shown that Shigella pathogenesis is imparted by a large virulence plasmid containing a pathogenicity island encoding a type three secretion system required for entry into epithelial cells; characterised the molecular mechanisms leading to Shigella epithelial cell invasion and intracellular motility; demonstrated that Shigella kills macrophages by pyroptosis; identified that intracellular bacteria are detected by Nod proteins leading to production of pro-inflammatory cytokines and identified a pool of Shigella effectors controlling both innate and adaptive responses. He also actively contributes to the development of vaccine candidates against the major shigellae causing dysentery in the developing world.

Sansonetti is the author of over 500 publications in peer-reviewed journals and has served as an editor of several professional publications for many years. He is considered to be one of the founders of the cellular microbiology field and has launched an eponym scientific publication dedicated to this field.  His achievements in science have been recognised by numerous awards, including:
 Jacques Monod prize for excellence in molecular biology
 Louis-Jeantet Prize for Medicine (1994)
 Robert Koch Prize
 Andre Lwoff Medal by the Federation of European Microbiological Societies
 Foreign Member of the Royal Society of London (ForMemRS]] (2014)

He was appointed a Knight of the National Order of the Legion of Honour Légion d'honneur and  Officer of the Ordre National du Mérite. He has also been elected Member of European Molecular Biology Organisation, the French Academy of Sciences, the German Academy of Sciences Leopoldina, the American Association for the Advancement of Science the US National Academy of Sciences, and corresponding member of the French Academy of Medicine. He is also a Howard Hughes Medical Institute scholar. Since 2008, he has held the position of Professor at the Collège de France, recipient of the Microbiology and Infectious Diseases Chair. His nomination for the Royal Society reads:

References 

1949 births
Living people
French microbiologists
Chevaliers of the Légion d'honneur
Members of the French Academy of Sciences
Foreign associates of the National Academy of Sciences
Foreign Members of the Royal Society
Pasteur Institute
Members of the German Academy of Sciences Leopoldina